Cyril Dean Darlington  (19 December 1903 – 26 March 1981) was an English biologist, cytologist, geneticist and eugenicist, who discovered the mechanics of chromosomal crossover, its role in inheritance, and therefore its importance to evolution. He was Sherardian Professor of Botany at the University of Oxford from 1953 to 1971.

Darlington's research on genetics contributed to modern evolutionary synthesis in the 20th century.

Biography

Early life
Cyril Darlington was born in Chorley, a small cotton town in Lancashire, England in 1903. His father, William was a teacher at a small school. He had one brother six years older. When he was eight, the family moved to London. His childhood was an unhappy one, characterised by a stern, bitter and frustrated father, who struggled mightily against poverty. He enjoyed neither sports, nor studies (including at the Mercers' School and St Paul's School, London). He began to develop a disdain for authority. He decided to become a farmer in Australia, so he applied to the South Eastern Agricultural College at Wye, known later as Wye College.  He was a rather indifferent student, but his social life took a decided turn for the better when he took up boxing, with some success. He was then six feet three inches tall, and an imposing figure. One subject that captured his imagination, however, was Mendelian genetics, taught by the myriapodologist Stanley Graham Brade-Birks (1887–1982).  Darlington discovered Thomas Hunt Morgan's The Physical Basis of Heredity.  He graduated with a London University Ordinary degree in 1923.

Early professional years
After being turned down for a scholarship to go to Trinidad as a farmer, Cyril was induced in 1923 by one of his professors to apply for a scholarship at the John Innes Horticultural Institution in Merton. He wrote at once to its director, William Bateson, famous for having introduced the word "genetics" into biology. His application was unsuccessful, but he wrangled a temporary post as an unpaid technician. It was an interesting time for the Innes. Bateson had spent the last two decades fighting against the notion that chromosomes were the seat of what he had been calling "heredity factors" and had only very recently capitulated.  He had just hired a cytologist, Frank Newton, who now began to take Cyril under his wing. Darlington published his first scientific paper, on the tetraploidy of the sour cherry, and he was hired as a permanent employee.

Shortly after, both of his mentors, Bateson and Newton, died within a year of each other and J.B.S. Haldane came to the Innes. Although neither an experimentalist nor cytologist, Haldane formed a close friendship with Darlington, whose self-confidence grew. He began to make significant contributions to the understanding of the relationship of genetic crossing-over and the microscopically observed events that the chromosome passed through during meiosis. 

In February 1929 he made a study trip with fellow botanist John Macqueen Cowan to the Near East.

In 1931 he began writing the book that would establish his reputation, Recent Advances in Cytology.  It was published in 1932, and created a firestorm of controversy at first, then nearly universal acceptance as a work of the first rank.  He showed that the mechanisms of evolution that acted at the level of the chromosome created possibilities far more rich than the simple mutations and deletions that affect single genes.

His now remarkable determination and achievement saw him become Director of the cytology department in 1937, and he became director of the Innes two years later, just 15 years after his arrival as an unpaid volunteer.  He was elected a Fellow of the Royal Society on 20 March 1941. A few months after that, he was awarded the prestigious Royal Medal. He was elected president of the Genetical Society. In 1947 he co-founded with Ronald Fisher the highly successful journal Heredity: An International Journal of Genetics, as a response to J.B.S. Haldane joining the Communist party and "taking the Journal of Genetics with him".

Later years
He left the Innes in 1953 and accepted the Sherardian Chair of Botany at Oxford University. He developed a keen interest in the Botanic Garden, going on to establish the 'Genetic Garden'. He was also involved in extending the teaching of science, especially genetics, in the university. He voiced strong support for hereditarians in an increasingly hostile academic environment. In 1972 he, along with 50 other prominent scientists signed "Resolution on Scientific Freedom Regarding Human Behavior and Heredity" in which a genetic approach to understanding the behaviour of man was strongly defended. He staunchly defended his colleague in the fight against Lysenkoism, John Baker, who published the controversial book "Race" in 1974. Races are, according to Baker (and Darlington), breeding populations with demarcations drawn at whatever level of detail is required for the problem at hand. Asked by a reporter for the Sunday times whether or not he was a racist, Darlington replied: "Well, I'm regarded as one by everyone except the Jews, who are racist, and who utterly agree with my views."

Darlington retired from his official position at the University in 1971, but remained in the university, tirelessly writing and publishing his work. He died in Oxford in 1981. He had five children, two of whom committed suicide.

Sociobiology and the Lysenko Affair
In his later years, Darlington increased his participation in the public debate about the role of science in society, and especially, its interaction with politics and government. He published, beginning in 1948, very strong condemnations of the events in the Soviet Union, which had denounced Mendelian genetics and officially outlawed its practice in favour of Lysenkoism. Some genetics institutes were destroyed, and prominent geneticists were purged or murdered. These events caused an upheaval among the leaders of genetics in the west, many of whom were leftist, socialists or even communist sympathizers and Marxists. This caused a break between Haldane and Darlington, who was intransigent in his anti-authoritarian views.

Darlington developed a strong interest in the application of genetic insights to the understanding of human history.  He believed that not only were there differences in the character and culture between individuals, but that these differences also exist between races. Understanding of these differences in scientific terms was not only interesting in its own right, but was crucial to the development of a civil society.

The nature of his views on race is well illustrated by his essay in Human Variation: The Biopsychology of Age, Race, and Sex (Academic Press 1978).  Darlington writes that "as slaves," Africans "improved in health and increased in numbers."  The environment was "more favorable than anything they had experienced in Africa." According to Darlington, emancipation resulted in the withdrawal of "discipline" and "protection" resulting in social problems such as unemployment "drugs, gambling and prostitution." Darlington concluded: "The intellectually well-endowed races, classes, and societies have a moral responsibility for the problems of race mixture, of immigration and exploitation, that have arisen from their exercise of economic and political power. They may hope to escape from these responsibilities by claiming an intellectual and, therefore, moral equality between all races, classes, and societies.  But the chapters of this book, step by step, deprive them of the scientific and historical evidence that might support such a comfortable illusion."

Darlington was opposed to the UNESCO Statement of Race. He agreed with Darwin's classical view: "The races differ also in constitution, in acclimatization, and in liability to certain diseases. Their mental characteristics are likewise very distinct; chiefly as it would appear in their emotional, but partly in their intellectual, faculties." Contrary to the UNESCO statement. Darlington thought that there might be a biological justification to prohibit interracial marriages "if intermarriage were not contrary to the habits of all stable communities and therefore in no need of discouragement". He refused to sign the revised 1951 statement which conceded that racial differences in intelligence possibly existed. Darlington's dissenting commentary was printed with the statement.

Over the course of twenty five years, from 1953 to 1978, Darlington completed his trilogy on Man: Genetics and Man (1953), The Evolution of Man and Society (1969) and finally The Little Universe of Man (1978). In these he tried to show how the history of man can be at least partially analysed in terms of genetic laws, breeding patterns, founder effects and Darwinian evolution. Darlington's views were an unusual endorsement of the complementary virtues of inbreeding, as well as of outbreeding.

Method and personality
Darlington's personality was one of a remarkable combination of anti-authoritarianism, nonconformity, and scientific rationalism.  He was as courageous in fighting the evils of Lysenkoism, as he was in combating the emerging academic orthodoxy on the nature of race. His method was not that of a simple bench scientist, but ranged far into the hinterlands of human existence.  His penchant for speculation and theorising was his strongest tool for arriving at new insights and truth. He said "...I have never proved anything. I do not count on doing so...What I do count on is to assemble such evidences and arguments as will make those who disagree with me feel more and more uncomfortable."

Books by Darlington
(A partial list)
Chromosomes and Plant Breeding, Macmillan (1932).
Recent Advances in Cytology, Churchill (1932).
Chromosome Atlas of Cultivated Plants, C D Darlington and E K Janaki Ammal (1945).
The Facts of Life, George Allen and Unwin (1953).
Darwin's Place in History, Blackwell (1959).
Chromosome Botany and the Origins of Cultivated Plants, Hafner Pub. Co (1963).
Genetics and Man, George Allen and Unwin (1964).
Cytology, Churchill (1965).
The Evolution of Man and Society, (1969) .
The Little Universe of Man, George Allen and Unwin (1978) .

References

External links
Oren Solomon Harman (2004) The Man Who Invented the Chromosome: A Life of Cyril Darlington .

https://web.archive.org/web/20040426220150/http://www.cycad.com/cgi-bin/pinc/apr2000/articles/tredoux-haldane-darlington.html 

1903 births
1981 deaths
20th-century British botanists
20th-century English male writers
People educated at Mercers' School
People educated at St Paul's School, London
Academics of the University of Oxford
Alumni of Imperial College London
Charles Darwin biographers
Critics of Lamarckism
English geneticists
English biologists
English eugenicists
Fellows of the Royal Society
Modern synthesis (20th century)
People from Chorley
Royal Medal winners
Sherardian Professors of Botany
Alumni of Wye College